Don't Copy That Floppy was an anti-copyright infringement campaign run by the Software Publishers Association (SPA) beginning in 1992.

The video for the campaign, starring M. E. Hart as "MC Double Def DP", was filmed at Cardozo High School in Washington, D.C. and produced by cooperation between the SPA, the Educational Section Anti-Piracy Committee, and the Copyright Protection Fund, in association with Vilardi Films.

The groups distributed the film for general viewing through VHS tapes that were mailed to schools. In later years, the film became a viral video sensation through websites such as YouTube, where the official video has had over 2 million views .

In May 2009, the Software and Information Industry Association (formed in 1999 when the Software Publishers Association merged with the Information Industry Association) released the trailer for a follow-up to Don't Copy That Floppy, called Don't Copy That 2, released on September 9, 2009. The sequel features MC Double Def DP as he continues his crusade against "piracy" in the digital age.

Synopsis 

Two teenagers, Jenny (played by Marja Allen) and Corey (played by Jimmy Todd), are playing a game on a classroom computer. Corey is exuberantly pushing keys to show the viewer that he is heavily immersed in the game action; Jenny is beating him.

Frustrated, he asks for a rematch, but she has an upcoming class and must leave. He decides he will copy the game so that he can play it at home. Upon inserting his blank floppy disk into the Apple Macintosh LC, a video pops up on the computer. This video is of a rapper named MC Double Def DP, the "Disk Protector" (played by M.E. Hart).

The point of the video is the message that copyright infringement of software will cause the video game industry to lose money, resulting in less production of computer games. (The games the video chooses as examples—The Oregon Trail, Tetris, and the Where in the World is Carmen Sandiego? series—were among the most successful and best-selling games from the end of the 1980s to the mid-1990s.)

The rap video portion is interspersed with interviews of artists, writers, programmers and a lawyer. These people are the staff responsible for design of an early version of the game Neverwinter Nights (then an America Online MMORPG) and allows them to explain the issue in greater detail:

 Craig Dykstra—America Online—Manager Developer Support
 Dave Butler—America Online—Director Platform Software Development
 Janet Hunter—America Online—Senior Systems Analyst
 Ilene Rosenthal—Software Publishers Association—Attorney

They explain how games are made, indicating that creating a game can involve 20 to 30 people integrating the various parts, and working on documentation, technical support, and marketing. The point they try to raise is that if sales are low, the authors may decide that the game is unpopular and stop making it.

At the end of the video, the DP fades away, leaving Corey and Jenny to decide for themselves whether they will copy the game — they decide against it. Corey, who has some money left over from his summer job, decides that he will buy the game. Jenny agrees and jokes that Corey's game will even come with a manual. The Wall Street Journal has stated that the film's aesthetic is similar to the television program Saved By the Bell. It has also highlighted it as an example of classic bubblegum hip-hop with significant staying power.

Criticism
The major criticism of the campaign came from educators and the press, who criticized the campaign for only promoting one point of view, instead of a broader scope of the issue of copyright online. That point of view, they argued, was biased because it benefited a specific group (the software publishing industry), and failed to present alternative views such as the Free Software movement.

Popularity online
In the mid 2000s, the popularity of the video was revived, but this time as a meme. Since the creators have always allowed noncommercial copying of the film, it became a viral video after video-sharing sites such as Google Video and YouTube went online in the mid-2000s. The video first gained popularity on the site YTMND in 2004 and then gained (and regained) widespread YouTube popularity in 2005, 2006, and 2008, sparking user-generated remixes and parodies, and is now considered a popular internet meme.

Sequel 
In May 2009, the Software and Information Industry Association (SIIA) released the trailer for a follow up to the original video of 1992, which premiered on September 9, 2009. Don't Copy That 2 features M. E. Hart reprising his role as "MC Double Def DP". The trailer shows armed SWAT police raiding homes and arresting the mothers of would-be pirates. The SIIA website says that "Antipiracy hero MC Double Def DP will return to drop some knowledge on would-be pirates in the sequel to 1992's 'Don't Copy That Floppy.'"

Criticism
Since its release, Don't Copy That 2 has been criticized by the press for being out of date, referencing material like the Doom series and Klingon that the current target audience (mostly teenagers) may not be familiar with. The sequel was also heavily criticized in the press for misrepresenting the way copyright law is enforced, what types of copying were actually considered "criminal" enough to prompt punishment, and what punishment actually looked like.

See also 

 Beware of illegal video cassettes
 Criticism of copyright
 Copyfraud
 Copyleft
 Copyright alternatives
 Criticism of intellectual property
 Home Recording Rights Coalition
 Home Taping Is Killing Music
 Internet freedom
 Knock-off Nigel
 Piracy is theft
 Public information film (PIF)
 Public service announcement
 Sony Corp. of America v. Universal City Studios, Inc.
 Spin (public relations)
 Steal This Film
 Who Makes Movies?
 You can click, but you can't hide
 You Wouldn't Steal a Car

References

External links 
Don't Copy That Floppy (Official Video – Digitally Remastered) at YouTube
Version available for download at the Internet Archive
Don't Copy That 2 (Official Sequel to Don't Copy That Floppy) at YouTube

Advertising campaigns
American advertising slogans
1992 neologisms
Copyright campaigns
Video game culture
Viral videos
Warez
Floppy disk computer storage